Ernest Evans may refer to:

 Ernest E. Evans (1908–1944), U.S. Navy officer who was awarded the Medal of Honor
 Ernest Evans (politician) (1885–1965), Welsh politician
 the real name of singer Chubby Checker
 Ernest Evans (cricketer) (1861–1948), English cricketer who played for Somerset
 Ernest Evans (priest), Welsh Anglican priest

See also 
 Earnest Evans, a 1991 video game for the Sega Genesis and Sega CD